Jaulakhel Durbar (Jaulakhel Palace) was a Rana palace in Jawalakhel, Lalitpur, the capital city of Nepal. Jaulakhel Durbar was built by Bir Shumsher Jang Bahadur Rana in 1954 BS.

History
The Jaulakhel Durbar area (the main gate was located just after St. Xaviers's School before the Jawalakhel roundabout), was previously owned and occupied by Major General Bambir Bikram Kunwar Ranaji son of Prime minister Bam Bahadur Kunwar. Bambir Bikram Kunwar Ranaji was later imprisoned in India for plotting against the crown of Nepal, resulting in nationalization of his property. In 1944 BS on request of Juddha Shumsher JBR's mother Juhar Kumari for a bigger residence, then Prime minister Bir Shumsher Jang Bahadur Rana ordered the construction of Jaulakhel Durbar in previously nationalized land of Bambir Bikram. Construction of Jaulakhel Durbar was completed in 1954 BS and was occupied by Juddha Shumsher JBR and his mother Juhar Kumari until 1989 Bs when Juddha became Prime Minister and moved to the official Prime minister's residence Singha Durbar. Jaulakhel Durbar was heavily damaged during the Earthquake of 1990 BS and was later renovated and given by Juddha Shumsher JBR to his son Surya Shumsher. After Surya's Death his only son Yuvaraj Shumsher inherited it.

The Jawalakhel Zoo was built on the grounds of Jawalakhel Durbar by General Maheswar Shamshere Rana at the behest of his grandfather Juddha Shamshere. It was a private zoo later made into the only national zoo in Nepal.

Club Rondeau
Jaulakhel Durbar was later turned into Club Rondeau by Yuvaraj Shumsher in 2007 BS.

Under Government of Nepal
After being unsuccessful in business Yuvaraj Shumsher sold Jaulakhel Durbar along with Club Rondeau. Currently the palace is occupied by a branch of the Office of Land Reform and Management.

See also
Rana palaces of Nepal
Mathabarsingh Thapa
Jung Bahadur Rana

References

Rana palaces of Nepal
Palaces in Kathmandu
Former palaces in Nepal